Patricia (Anne Klein, née Ernst) Brisco Matthews (July 1, 1927 in San Fernando, California, United States - December 7, 2006 in Prescott, Arizona, United States) was an American writer of gothic, romance and mystery novels. She wrote under the pen names P.A. Brisco, Patty Brisco, Pat A. Brisco, Pat Brisco, Patricia Matthews and Laura Wylie. She collaborated with her second husband, Clayton Matthews, on romance and mystery (suspense) novels; they were called "the hottest couple in paperbacks." She also collaborated with Denise Hrivnak as Denise Matthews.

Biography
Patricia Anne Klein Ernst was born on July 1, 1927 in San Fernando, California, the daughter of Roy Oliver Ernst and Gladys Gable. Her mother enrolled her in the famous Meglin Kiddies school, but she recorded only two of her songs professionally for one demo tape. She studied at California State University, Los Angeles, where she worked as secretary to the General Manager of Associated Students by the California State College.

On 21 December 1946 she married Marvin Owen Brisco, they had two sons: Michael Arvie and David Roy. By 1961, the marriage had ended in divorce. Focused on her writing career, she met the writer Clayton Matthews in a local writers' group. After Matthews divorced his first wife, he and Patricia married on 3 November 1972 and lived near San Diego.

Matthews started to write poetry, juvenile books, a play, fantasy and mystery short stories, which she signed under different names: Patricia Ernst, P.A. Brisco and Pat A. Brisco. Using the names Patty Brisco and Pat Brisco, she wrote gothic novels.

When the market for gothic novels softened, at the suggestion of the Matthews' agent, Jay Garon, she began to write romance novels under her second married name, Patricia Matthews.  She and her husband also collaborated on several romance and suspense novels using the pseudonyms Laura Wylie and Laurie Wylie.  She and her husband wrote five Casey Farrell mystery novels together, and she wrote three on her own, the Thumbprint Mysteries, set in the American Southwest.  With Denise Hrivnak, she also wrote under the pseudonym Denise Matthews.

In 1989 they moved to Prescott, Arizona where they were involved in local theater productions and even produced a play of their own. Her husband Clayton died on 25 March 2004. Patricia died on December 7, 2006 in the Brisco family home in Prescott, Arizona.

Awards

1983 Reviewers Choice Awards for Best Historical Gothic
1986-87 Affaire de Coeur Silver Pen Readers Award

Bibliography

As P.A. Brisco

Single Novel
Harold Jensen's Hope Chest, 1959

As Patty Brisco

Single Novels
Horror at Gull House, 1969
Merry's Treasure, 1969
The Crystal Window, 1973
House of Candles, 1973
Mist of Evil, 1976
Raging Rapids, 1978
Too Much In Love, 1979

As Pat A. Brisco

Single Novels
The Other People, 1970

As Pat Brisco

Single Novels
The Carnival Mystery, 1974
Campus mystery, 1978

As Patricia Matthews

Hannah Bilogy
Love's Avenging Heart,	1976
Dance of Dreams,	1983

Single Novels
Love Forever More,	1977
Love's Wildest Promise,	1977
Love's Daring Dream,	1978
Love's Pagan Heart,	1978
Love's Golden Destiny,	1979
Love's Magic Moments ,	1979
Love's Bold Journey,	1980
Love's Raging Tide,        1980
Love's Sweet Agony,	1980
Tides of Love,	1981
Embers of Dawn,	1982
Flames of Glory,	1982
Gambler in Love,	1984
Tame the Restless Heart,	1985
Thursday and the Lady,	1987
Enchanted,	1987
Mirrors,	1988
Oasis,	1988
Sapphire,	1989
The Dreaming Tree,	1989
The Death of Love,	1990
The Unquiet,	1991
Dead Man Riding,	1999
Death in the Desert,	1999
Secret of Secco Canyon,	1998
Rendezvous at Midnight,	2004

Poems
Love's Many Faces,	1979

Single novels with Clayton Matthews
Midnight Whispers,	1981
Empire,	1982
Midnight Lavender,	1985

Casey Farrell Series with Clayton Matthews
The Scent of Fear,	1992
Vision of Death,	1993
Taste of Evil,	1994
Sound of Murder,	1994
Touch of Terror,	1995

Anthologies in collaboration
On Wings of Magic, 1994 (with Andre Norton and Sasha Miller)

As Laura Wylie

Single Novel
The Night Visitor, 1979

References and sources

Patricia Matthews's Webpage in  Fantastic Fiction
Goodbye to Patricia Matthews in Science Fiction & Fantasy Writers of America, Inc. Website
International Who's Who of Authors and Writers 2004 by Taylor & Francis Group, Elizabeth Sleeman, Alison Neale

1927 births
2006 deaths
20th-century American novelists
21st-century American novelists
American romantic fiction writers
American women novelists
Writers from California
20th-century American women writers
21st-century American women writers